Mont Blanc de Cheilon (also spelled Mont Blanc de Seilon) is a mountain of the Pennine Alps, located in the Swiss canton of Valais. The mountain lies between the valleys of Bagnes and Arolla. Culminating at 3,870 metres above sea level, it is one of the highest summits between the Grand Combin to the west and the Dent Blanche to the east. The massif is glaciated, with the Cheilon Glacier to the north, the Giétro Glacier to the west, the Brenay Glacier to the south and the Tsijiore Nouve Glacier to the east.

The first ascent of the mountain was made by Johann Jakob Weilenmann and J. Felley on 11 September 1865.

Huts
 Cabane des Dix (2,928 m)
 Cabane des Vignettes (3,158 m)

External links
 Mont Blanc de Cheilon on SummitPost

Mountains of the Alps
Alpine three-thousanders
Mountains of Valais
Pennine Alps
Bagnes
Mountains of Switzerland
Three-thousanders of Switzerland